Charles Winfield Waterman (November 2, 1861August 27, 1932) was a Colorado attorney and politician.  He is most notable for his service as a United States senator from Colorado.

Born in Waitsfield, Vermont, Waterman graduated from the University of Vermont in 1885 and taught school before attending the University of Michigan Law School.  Following his 1889 graduation, Waterman moved to Denver, where he became a successful corporate and railroad attorney and was active in politics as a Republican.  After serving as a delegate to the 1916 Republican National Convention and running unsuccessfully for the Republican U.S. Senate nomination in 1918, Waterman was the Colorado manager for Calvin Coolidge's 1924 presidential campaign.  After Coolidge won, he appointed Waterman general counsel for the Federal Oil Conservation Board.  He was a delegate to the 1924 Republican National Convention, and later that year ran unsuccessfully for the U.S. Senate in a special election, losing the Republican nomination for a two-year term to Rice W. Means, who went on to win the general election.

In 1926, Waterman defeated Means for the Republican nomination for a full six-year term.  He defeated Democrat William Ellery Sweet in the general election, and served from 1927 until his death.  Waterman became ill in 1932, and announced that he would not be a candidate for re-election that year.  His health continued to worsen, and he died in Washington, D.C., on August 27.  He was buried at Cedar Hill Cemetery in Suitland, Maryland.

Waterman was also a noted philanthropist; in addition to creating a charitable fund for Colorado attorneys, he donated a substantial amount to the University of Vermont, including funds for the construction of a campus building named for Waterman and his wife.

Early life
Waterman was born in Waitsfield, Washington County, Vermont, on November 2, 1861, the son of John Waterman and Mary (Leach) Waterman.  He worked on his family's farm, attended the Waitsfield public schools, and graduated from St. Johnsbury Academy.  He graduated from the University of Vermont in Burlington in 1885, and was a school teacher and principal in Mooers, New York, Groton, Connecticut, and Fort Dodge, Iowa, from 1885 to 1888.

Legal career

Waterman graduated from the University of Michigan Law School in 1889, was admitted to the bar, and commenced practice in the Denver office of Republican politician John F. Shafroth.  He later practiced as the partner of Edward O. Wolcott, and then as the principal of his own firm.  Waterman was a successful corporation lawyer, and his clients included the Great Western Sugar Company, Great Western Railway of Colorado, Chicago, Burlington and Quincy Railroad, Denver and Rio Grande Western Railroad, and New York Life Insurance Company.

Political career
He was also active in Republican politics, and was a delegate to the 1916 Republican National Convention.  In 1918, he was an unsuccessful candidate for the Republican nomination for U.S. Senator; he lost to Lawrence C. Phipps, who went on to defeat John F. Shafroth (now a Democrat) in the general election.

Waterman was a member of the University of Vermont board of trustees from 1921 to 1925; in 1922, he received the honorary degree of LL.D. from UVM.

In 1923 and 1924, Waterman was active in the effort to elect Calvin Coolidge to a full term as president, and managed his campaign in Colorado; In December 1924, Coolidge rewarded Waterman with appointment as general counsel for the newly-created federal Oil Conservation Board, a panel made up of the Secretaries of War, Navy, Interior, and Commerce. In addition, he was a delegate to the 1924 Republican National Convention.

In 1924, Waterman was an unsuccessful candidate for the Republican nomination for the U.S. Senate seat left vacant by the death of Samuel D. Nicholson.  He lost to Rice W. Means, a candidate supported by the Ku Klux Klan; Means went on to win the general election for the remainder of Nicholson's term, defeating John Shafroth's son Morrison Shafroth.

Waterman ran again in 1926, and defeated Means for the Republican nomination.  He then defeated former Governor William Ellery Sweet, the Democratic nominee, in the general election.  He served in the Senate from March 4, 1927 until his death. During his Senate term, Waterman was chairman of the Committee on Patents and the Committee on Enrolled Bills (72nd Congress).  According to one source, Waterman's Senate record made him the most conservative member ever of either the U.S. House or U.S. Senate.

Philanthropy
Bequests from the estate of Charles Waterman and his wife included the creation of a charitable trust to benefit Colorado attorneys who face financial burdens because of age or illness.  In addition, the Watermans donated funds to the University of Vermont for the design and construction of the Charles Winfield Waterman and Anna R. Waterman Memorial Building.  The Waterman building has been used for several purposes since it opened in 1941, and in recent years has been the location of admissions and other administrative offices.

Death and burial

Waterman became ill in 1932 and announced that he would not be a candidate for reelection.  He died at the Wardman Park Hotel in Washington, D.C., on August 27, 1932.  His remains were cremated and interred at Cedar Hill Cemetery in Suitland, Maryland.

Family
On June 18, 1890, Waterman married Anna Rankin Cook (1865–1939) of Burlington, Vermont.

See also
 List of United States Congress members who died in office (1900–49)

References

Sources

Books

Newspapers

Internet

External links

1861 births
1932 deaths
St. Johnsbury Academy alumni
Colorado Republicans
University of Vermont alumni
People from Waitsfield, Vermont
Republican Party United States senators from Colorado
Politicians from Fort Dodge, Iowa
University of Michigan Law School alumni